Võ Thanh Tùng (born 26 July 1985) is a Vietnamese Paralympic swimmer. He won gold in the men's 50m freestyle S5 at the 2010 Asian Para Games in China. He is seen as a possible medal contender for his nation. He lives in Cần Thơ and had poliomyelitis as a child.

References 

Swimmers at the 2012 Summer Paralympics
Vietnamese male freestyle swimmers
People with polio
People from Cần Thơ
1985 births
Living people
Paralympic competitors for Vietnam
Medalists at the 2016 Summer Paralympics
Paralympic medalists in swimming
Medalists at the World Para Swimming Championships
Paralympic silver medalists for Vietnam
Swimmers at the 2020 Summer Paralympics
S5-classified Paralympic swimmers
Medalists at the 2010 Asian Para Games
Medalists at the 2014 Asian Para Games
Medalists at the 2018 Asian Para Games